The Marquette University College of Nursing is one of the constituent colleges at Marquette University, located in Milwaukee, Wisconsin. Its programs and curricula are accredited by the Commission on Collegiate Nursing Education, the Accreditation Commission for Midwifery Education of the American College of Nurse-Midwives, the NCACSS and the Wisconsin State Board of Nursing.

History 
Nursing at Marquette began in 1912, when the university acquired the Trinity Hospital Training School for Nursing in Milwaukee and the nurses' residence. Although classes began soon after the acquisition, the College of Nursing officially became its own separate college in 1936. Over 7,000 students have graduated from Marquette's nursing program since its beginning. The college is housed in Emory T. Clark Hall on Marquette's campus.

Programs and reputation
The College of Nursing offers bachelor's, master's, and clinical doctorate degrees, as well as PhDs in nursing. There are also various dual-degree and interdisciplinary programs at both the undergraduate and graduate levels.

In 2015, the College of Nursing opened a satellite program in Indianapolis, IN, in partnership with St.Vincent Health, to provide an Adult-Older Adult Acute Care Nurse Practitioner program where after students can sit for the Adult Gerontology acute care certification exam.

In 2012, U.S. News & World Report listed the college's graduate program as the 44th best in the country. Its graduate program in midwifery was ranked 19th nationally.

References

External links
Marquette University College of Nursing

Marquette University
Nursing schools in Wisconsin
Educational institutions established in 1912
1912 establishments in Wisconsin